The Prelude in F-sharp minor, Op. 23, No. 1 is a composition by Sergei Rachmaninoff completed and premiered in 1903. It is one of  ten preludes composed by Rachmaninoff in 1901 and 1903.

Structure 
The prelude is ternary and homophonic in nature. The "A" section (measures 1–13) introduces the first theme, section "B" (13–30) introduces a new set of variations, and measures 30–41 mark an altered return to the original "A" theme. Each of the larger ternary sections contains its set of "micro-variations" marked by changes in note values, dynamics, and rhythm. For instance, the "A" theme, introduced in measures 1 and 2, is varied in measure 8.

Measure 2

Measure 8

The Prelude proceeds from F-sharp minor to the relative major (A major) in measure 13, and returns to the tonic in measure 30.

A "hidden" chromatic sequence in the "A" section occurs in the bass line on the second beat of measure 1 and the first beat of measures 2–6. This sequence is later revealed as the basis for the "B" theme, first introduced transitorily as a modulation between the "A" and "B" sections. Compare measures 6 and 24:

Measure 6

Measure 24

References

External links 

Preludes by Sergei Rachmaninoff
Compositions in F-sharp minor